The 1993–94 Football League Trophy, known as the 1993–94 Autoglass Trophy, was the ninth staging of the Football League Trophy, a knock-out competition for English football clubs in the Second Division and the Third Division. The winners were Swansea City and the runners-up were Huddersfield Town.

The competition began on 27 September 1993 and ended with the final on 24 April 1994 at Wembley Stadium.

In the first round, there were two sections split into seven groups: North and South. In the following rounds each section gradually eliminates teams in knock-out fashion until each has a winning finalist. At this point, the two winning finalists face each other in the combined final for the honour of the trophy.

First round

Northern Section 
Bradford City and Rochdale received byes to second round

Southern Section 
Leyton Orient and Bournemouth received byes to second round.

Second round

Northern Section

Southern Section

Quarter-finals

Northern Section

Southern Section

Area semi-finals

Northern Section

Southern Section

Area finals

Northern Area final

Southern Area final

Final

Notes
General
statto.com

Specific

EFL Trophy
Tro
1993–94 domestic association football cups